Songhuajiang is a town in the city of Dehui, in the north of Jilin Province in Northeast China. The town seat is in Songhuajiang Village.

The area has good transportation links, with the Hada Railway (Harbin–Dalian) and the Jingha Expressway (Beijing–Harbin) nearby.

References

Township-level divisions of Jilin